NGC 536 is a barred spiral galaxy located in the constellation Andromeda. It is located at a distance of circa 200 million light-years from Earth, which, given its apparent dimensions, means that NGC 536 is about 180,000 light years across. It was discovered by William Herschel on September 13, 1784. It is a member of Hickson Compact Group 10, which also includes the galaxies NGC 529, NGC 531, and NGC 542. It belongs to the Perseus–Pisces Supercluster.

The nucleus of NGC 536 is characterised as a low-ionization nuclear emission-line region (LINER), a type of active galactic nucleus. The galaxy features a bright inner region, surrounded by a ring from which emanate two faint arms with H II regions. These extended spiral arms have been suggested to be tidal tails. The galaxy has very weak Hα emission. The galaxy is seen with inclination of 78 degrees.

One supernova has been observed in NGC 536, SN 1963N. It was discovered by the Palomar Supernova Search on June 27, 1963, with mag 17.7.

References

External links 
 

NGC 536 on SIMBAD

Barred spiral galaxies
Andromeda (constellation)
0536
01013
005344
+06-04-021
Astronomical objects discovered in 1784
Discoveries by William Herschel